Kholosi is an Indo-Aryan language spoken in two villages in southern Iran that was first described in 2008. At its current status, the language is considered endangered. In 2008, it was only spoken in the neighboring villages of Kholus and Gotav. As it is located on the Iranian Plateau and surrounded by Iranian languages, it draws heavily from them.

Classification
Kholosi is definitively known to be an Indo-Aryan language albeit with significant lexical borrowing from Iranian languages given its geographical location. At the lexical level, it seems to share vocabulary largely with the Sindhi languages, which are the source of other Indo-Aryan migrations to the Middle East such as Luwati in Oman.

Phonology
While no published phonology has been found on Kholosi, the following phonology has been constructed from examples provided in the sources below.

Kholosi also contains the diphthongs /ɑi, ɑw, ow/ and possibly others.

Note*: The phonemes marked with an asterisk are assumed based on the structure of the attested phonemes.

Grammar
Anonby and Bahmani (2013) made some brief notes on Kholosi grammar, but so far no grammatical sketch nor a full grammar of the language has been documented.

Morphology

Nouns and noun phrases
Nouns have inherent grammatical gender, and adjectives agree in gender with the head noun. Attributive adjectives follow the head noun, unlike other Indo-Aryan languages. Numerals precede the head noun.

Verbs and verb phrases
Kholosi uses several light verbs to form noun-verb compounds. This is a common feature of Indo-Iranian languages.

The adverb precedes the verb it modifies.

Case and adpositions
Kholosi has noun-suffixed postpositions (e.g. the genitive marker -jo which agrees with the gender of the possessor) as characteristic of Indo-Aryan languages.

Syntax
Kholosi is a verb-final language with SOV word order.

Vocabulary
Kholosi has roughly twice the number of Indo-Aryan terms in its basic lexicon than Iranian borrowings. The primary source of Iranian borrowings is Persian, but Larestani and Bandari (in the same geographical area) also appear to have contributed vocabulary.

A high degree of similarity with Indo-Aryan languages

Indo-Aryan vocabulary in Kholosi

Kholosi Indo-Iranian vocabulary aligned with Indo-Aryan sound changes

A significant proportion of structures shared with neighbouring Iranian languages

Iranian vocabulary in Kholosi

Words illustrating the local character of Iranian vocabulary in Kholosi

Lack of contrastive aspiration on stops in Kholosi

A full fricative series in Kholosi

Lack of an implosive series in Kholosi

Complex predicates in Kholosi

Distinctive structures in Kholosi

Distinctive Kholosi vocabulary

References

Indo-Aryan languages
Languages of Iran